Louis de Melun, Duke of Joyeuse (October 1694 – 31 July 1724) was a French noble man. He was the Prince of Epinoy, Baron then Duke of Joyeuse (1714) and Peer of France, Baron of Cysoing, Antoing and Wiers, Earl of Saint-Pol, Viscount of Gand, châtelain de Bapaume, Lord of Villemareuil, of Vaucourtois and of Saint-Jean-les-Deux-Jumeaux.

Biography

Louis was the only son born to his parents.  His sister Anne Julie Adélaïde de Melun was born in 1698 and was an ancestor of the future maréchal de Soubise, princesse de Condé Madame de Guéméné and the murdered duc d'Enghien.

His father died in 1704 of smallpox making the infant Louis the Prince of Epinoy. Ten years later he was also made ducal-peer of Joyeuse.

On 23 February 1716 he married Armande de La Tour d'Auvergne, daughter of Emmanuel Théodose de La Tour d'Auvergne and a grand daughter of the famous Marie Anne Mancini.

After being widowed in 1717, it was well known that he also contracted a secret marriage to Marie Anne de Bourbon in 1719. Marie Anne, known as Mademoiselle de Clermont was a daughter of Louis de Bourbon and Louise Françoise de Bourbon who was in turn an illegitimate daughter of Louis XIV and Madame de Montespan. Marie Anne was also the head of the future Queen's household.

Louis died in 1724, during a hunting party at Marie Anne's ancestral home, the Château de Chantilly. Naturally distraught, Marie Anne never married again. She was never to have any children.

As Louis had no children with Armande either, the county of Saint-Pol, as well as the principality of  Joyeuse went to his eldest nephew, the young Duke of Rohan, who was a son of his sister Anne Julie.

Ancestry

References and notes

Sources 
M.-Fr. Dantine, Ch. Clémencet et al., L'art de vérifier les dates..., vol. 12, impr. Valade, 1818 (réimpr. 4e), p. 413
de la Chenaye-Desbois, Dictionnaire de la noblesse, contenant les généalogies, l'histoire..., vol. X, impr. Antoine Boudet, Paris, 1775 (réimpr. 2e), p. 22

17th-century French people
18th-century French people
1694 births
1724 deaths
French princes
Louis
House of Melun
Princes of Epinoy
Counts of Saint-Pol
Peers created by Louis XIV